Maja Göpel (born 27 June 1976) is a German political economist, transformation researcher, and sustainability scientist with a focus on transdisciplinary work. As a speaker and author, she has increasingly specialised in science communication since 2019 when she co-founded the Scientists for Future initiative. Göpel is an honorary professor at Leuphana University of Lüneburg.

Early life and education 
Göpel was born in Bielefeld. She received a diploma in media and communications from the University of Siegen in 2001 and her PhD in political economy from the University of Kassel in 2007.

Career 
From 2006 to 2012, Göpel helped start the World Future Council as Campaign Manager Climate Energy in Hamburg and as Director Future Justice of the Brussels office, working in EU and UN contexts. From 2013 to  2017, she served as head of the Berlin office of the Wuppertal Institute for Climate, Environment and Energy with a focus on sustainability transformations. In 2016, she published her book The Great Mindshift: How a New Economic Paradigm and Sustainability Transformations Go Hand in Hand that summarizes research on system transformations, political economy and change management with an emphasis on a change in paradigms, mindsets (mentality) and competencies with which humans shape technical, economic, and social institutions. From 2017 to 2020, she was Secretary General of the German Advisory Council on Global Change (WBGU), a body that advises the German government on shaping its policies towards sustainability. In 2019, she was appointed honorary professor at the Leuphana University of Lüneburg. Also in 2019, she co-founded the Scientists for Future initiative, which published a statement of thousands of scientists validating the claims of the Fridays for Future student protests. In February 2020, Göpel published the non-fiction book Unsere Welt neu denken. Eine Einladung (Ullstein Verlag), which became number 3 on the German annual bestseller list 2020. From 2020 to 2021, she was Director of Research of The New Institute, founded in Hamburg in 2020, before she decided to devote more time to science communication. End of 2021, she became visiting professor at the College of Europe in Bruges.

Göpel is, among others, a member of the Bioeconomy Council of the German Federal Government, the International Club of Rome, the World Future Council, the Balaton Group founded by Donella Meadows and Dennis Meadows in 1982, and the German Commission for UNESCO, as well as of the Board of Trustees of WWF Germany, the Board of Trustees of the Museum of Natural History Berlin, the advisory board of the Bartlett School of Environment, Energy and Resources (BSEER) at University College London and the advisory board of the ZOE Institute for Future-fit Economies.

Göpel was nominated by the Alliance 90/The Greens as delegate to the Federal Convention for the purpose of electing the President of Germany in 2022.

Awards 
In 2019, Maja Göpel received the Adam Smith Prize, in 2020 the "Umwelt- und Nachhaltigkeitspreis des Bundesdeutschen Arbeitskreises für Umweltbewusstes Management (B.A.U.M)". In 2021, she was awarded the Erich Fromm Prize, the Theodor Heuss Prize as well as the Science Communication Medal of the Max Planck Society. Also in 2021, The Frankfurter Allgemeine Zeitung ranked her 17th among the 100 most influential German economists.

Selected works 

Göpel, M., & Arhelger, M. (2010). How to Protect Future Generations' Rights in European Governance. In: Intergenerational Justice Review (1).
Göpel, M. (2010). Formulating Future Just Policies: Applying the Delhi Sustainable Development Law Principles. In: Sustainability 2/6 2010, pp. 1694–1718, doi:10.3390/su2061694.
Göpel, M. (2011). The Tragedy of our Growth Saga. In: F. Hinterberger, E. Pirgmaier et al. (eds.): Growth in Transition. Earthscan, London, pp. 147–153, ISBN 978-1-84971-395-5.
Göpel, M. (2011). Shared Responsibilities and Future Generations: Beyond the Dominant Concepts of Justice, in: Council of Europe (eds.), Towards a Europe of Shared Social Responsibilities: Challenges and Strategies. Trends in Social Cohesion, No. 23, Council of Europe Publishing, Strasbourg, pp. 135–155, http://www.coe.int/t/dg3/socialpolicies/socialcohesiondev/source/Trends/Trends_23_EN.pdf.
Göpel, M. (2012). Ombudspersons for Future Generations as Sustainability Implementation Inits. In: Stakeholder Forum Vol. 204. https://stakeholderforum.org/sdg2012-think-pieces/.
Göpel, M. (2013). The Responsibility to Prevent: Early Warning Systems to Protect Future Generations, in: M.C. Cordonier Segger, S. Jodoin (eds.), Sustainable Development, International Criminal Justice and Treaty Implementation, Cambridge University Press, Cambridge.
Göpel, M. (2014). Navigating a New Agenda: Questions and Answers on Paradigm Shifts & Transformational Change, working paper, Wuppertal Institute, http://epub.wupperinst.org/frontdoor/index/index/docId/5517.
Göpel, M. (2016). The Great Mindshift: How a New Economic Paradigm and Sustainability Transformations Go Hand in Hand. Springer International, Berlin 2016, ISBN 978-3-319-43765-1, doi:10.1007/978-3-319-43766-8.
Göpel M. (2016) Why the Mainstream Economic Paradigm Cannot Inform Sustainability Transformations. In: The Great Mindshift. The Anthropocene: Politik—Economics—Society—Science, vol 2. Springer, Cham. https://doi.org/10.1007/978-3-319-43766-8_3
Göpel, M. (2017). Shedding Some Light on the Invisible: The Transformative Power of Paradigm Shifts, in: T. Henfrey, G. Maschkowski and G. Penha-Lopes (eds.), Resilience, Community Action & Societal Transformation, Permanent Publications, pp. 113–140.
Göpel, M. with Ioan Fazey et al. (2017). Ten Essentials for Action-Oriented and Second Order Energy Transitions, Transformations and Climate Change Research, in: Energy Research & Social Science, Vol. 40, pp. 54–70.
As Co-Author of the German Advisory Council on Global Change (WBGU) (2019). Just & In-Time Climate Policy. Four Initiatives for a Fair Transformation, Policy Paper, https://www.wbgu.de/en/publications/publication/just-in-time-climate-policy-four-initiatives-for-a-fair-transformation.
As Co-Author of the German Advisory Council on Global Change (WBGU) (2019). Towards Our Common Digital Future, Flagship Report, https://www.wbgu.de/en/publications/publication/towards-our-common-digital-future.
As Co-Author of the German Advisory Council on Global Change (WBGU) (2019). Digital Momentum for the UN Sustainability Agenda in the 21st Century, Policy Paper, https://www.wbgu.de/en/publications/publication/pp10-2019.
As Co-Author of the German Advisory Council on Global Change (WBGU) (2019). A European Way to Our Common Digital Future, Policy Paper, https://www.wbgu.de/en/publications/publication/pp11-2019.
As Co-Author of the German Advisory Council on Global Change (WBGU) (2020). Rethinking Land in the Anthropocene: from Separation to Integration, Flagship Report, https://www.wbgu.de/en/publications/publication/landshift.
Göpel, M. (2020). Unsere Welt neu denken: Eine Einladung. Ullstein, Berlin, ISBN 978-3-550-20079-3. Translations: Dutch, Greek, Japanese, Korean, Portuguese, Russian.
Göpel, M. (2020). A Social-Green Deal, with Just Transition—the European Answer to the Coronavirus Crisis, in: Social Europe, 31. März 2020, https://socialeurope.eu/a-social-green-deal-with-just-transition-the-european-answer-to-the-coronavirus-crisis.

References

External links

1975 births
German economists
Living people
Academic staff of the Leuphana University of Lüneburg
Writers from Bielefeld
Sustainability scientists
Academic staff of the University of Hamburg
University of Siegen alumni
University of Kassel alumni